Premchand (1880–1936), was a Hindu and Urdu poet.

Premchand may also refer to:

Premchand Aggarwal, Indian politician
Premchand Degra, Indian bodybuilder
Premchand Guddu, Indian politician
Premchand Roychand, Indian businessman